James Walker (born 1897, date of death unknown) was a South African cyclist. He won the Silver Medal in Tandem and a Bronze in the 4000m Team Pursuit Men in the 1920 Summer Olympics.

References

1897 births
Year of death missing
South African male cyclists
Olympic cyclists of South Africa
Cyclists at the 1920 Summer Olympics
Olympic silver medalists for South Africa
Olympic bronze medalists for South Africa
Olympic medalists in cycling
Medalists at the 1920 Summer Olympics